The IX Mediterranean Games, commonly known as the 1983 Mediterranean Games, were the 9th Mediterranean Games. The Games were held in Casablanca, Morocco, from 3 to 17 September 1983, where 2,192 athletes (1,845 men and 347 women) from 16 countries participated. There were a total of 162 medal events from 20 different sports.

Participating nations
The following is a list of nations that participated in the 1983 Mediterranean Games:

Sports

 (demonstration sport)

Medal table

External links 
 Olympic Council of Serbia 1983 Mediterranean Games results

See also
International Mediterranean Games Committee
Mediterranean Games Athletic results at gbrathletics website

 
M
M
Sport in Casablanca
Multi-sport events in Morocco
Mediterranean Games
Mediterranean Games by year
20th century in Casablanca
September 1983 sports events in Africa